Anton Sluka is a paralympic athlete from Slovakia competing mainly in category B3 marathon events.

Anton first competed in the Paralympics in 1992 in Barcelona for Czechoslovakia where he finished fifth in the 5000m and won the silver medal behind Britain's Mark Farnell in the Marathon.  Four years later at the 1996 Paralympic Games in Atlanta, competing for Slovakia, Anton reversed the result of four years earlier in taken the Marathon gold ahead of silver medalist Mark Farnell.  At the 2000 Paralympic Games Anton won his second Marathon silver medal, this proved to be the last time he finished a Paralympic Marathon as in 2004 he failed to finish in the Athens Marathon.

References

External links
 

Paralympic athletes of Slovakia
Athletes (track and field) at the 1992 Summer Paralympics
Athletes (track and field) at the 1996 Summer Paralympics
Athletes (track and field) at the 2000 Summer Paralympics
Athletes (track and field) at the 2004 Summer Paralympics
Paralympic gold medalists for Slovakia
Paralympic silver medalists for Slovakia
Paralympic silver medalists for Czechoslovakia
Slovak male long-distance runners
Living people
Year of birth missing (living people)
Medalists at the 1992 Summer Paralympics
Medalists at the 1996 Summer Paralympics
Medalists at the 2000 Summer Paralympics
Paralympic medalists in athletics (track and field)
Slovak male marathon runners
Visually impaired long-distance runners
Paralympic marathon runners
Visually impaired marathon runners